Néstor Rodulfo (born 18 October 1972) is a Puerto Rican actor, known for his roles in the Argos Comunicación and Telemundo productions. His first major role was in Rosa diamante playing Ramón Gómez. His second important role was in Amar a muerte playing El Alacrán. Rodulfo studied at the University of Puerto Rico at Bayamón, and in parallel to his studies at the university, he performed acting studies at the Performance Workshop established by Luz María Rondón and Herman O'Neill. Despite not standing out much in the field of film and television. He has made himself known for several plays of theaters in Puerto Rico and Mexico.

Filmography

Film roles

Selected television roles

References

External links 
 

1972 births
Living people
Puerto Rican male film actors
Puerto Rican male telenovela actors
Puerto Rican male television actors
People from San Juan, Puerto Rico